Spain has the following national youth football teams:

 Spain national under-23 football team
 Spain national under-21 football team
 Spain national under-20 football team
 Spain national under-19 football team
 Spain national under-18 football team
 Spain national under-17 football team
 Spain national under-16 football team
 Spain national under-15 football team
Youth football in Spain
Youth

es:Selección de fútbol de España#Categorías inferiores